Olethreutes valdanum is a species of tortricid moth in the family Tortricidae.

The MONA or Hodges number for Olethreutes valdanum is 2812.

References

Further reading

External links

 

Olethreutini
Moths described in 1922